Åreskutan is a  mountain at Åre in Jämtland in central Sweden. It is one of the better-known mountains in Sweden with a history of winter sport tourism dating back to the 1800's. The mountain (and the village of Åre itself) is easily accessible by train. The mountain massif features the largest ski resort area in Sweden.

Åre has hosted three Alpine World Ski Championships: 

1954 FIS Alpine World Ski Championships.

2007 FIS Alpine World Ski Championships. 

2019 FIS Alpine World Ski Championships.

In 1999, Åre was the host of the UCI Mountain Bike & Trials World Championships.

References
Caves and Mountains in Sweden Sweden's official website for tourism and travel information, retrieved on January 10, 2006

External links
 FIS WC Homepage
Åreskutan 360 panorama from virtualsweden

Mountains of Sweden
Landforms of Jämtland County
Geological type localities